Ohlstadt is a municipality in the district of Garmisch-Partenkirchen, in Bavaria, Germany.

Transport
The district has a railway station, on the Munich–Garmisch-Partenkirchen railway.

Notable people 
 Wolfgang Zimmerer (born 1940, in Ohlstadt) retired bobsledder, competed as a driver with his brakeman Peter Utzschneider from Murnau am Staffelsee. Zimmerer took part in the 1968, 1972 and 1976 Winter Olympics an

References

External links
 Official site 

Garmisch-Partenkirchen (district)